Golaš is a mountain in Serbia.

See also
List of mountains in Serbia

References

Mountains of Serbia